I Wanna Be A Model (我要做Model3) featured a cast of 16 contestants (eight male models and eight female models) who competed with each other to become the ultimate male and female supermodel. The  participants had to outshine each other on the catwalk fashion shows, photo shoots, self-make-up and self-styling assignments and in video clip shoots.

Among with the prize was: a one-year modeling contract with Cilla & Associates Sdn Bhd, will be appeared on the cover of Citta Bella magazine, a one-year membership with Celebrity Fitness, a gift from Sasa cosmetics worth RM10,000, a brand new Sony Ericsson C903 mobile phones, a voucher from Lewré worth RM1,000, and a cash prize of RM10,000.

Contestants
In order of elimination

Episode guide

Episode 1: Auditions
Original air date: July 7, 2009

The episode showcases the auditions in Kuala Lumpur, and the 16 finalists are selected.

Episode 2: Promotional Shoot
Original air date: July 14, 2009

The models have modeling 101 workshops and later have their promotional photo shoot. Lastly, the models have a challenge that will determine who will be eliminated for the first week. Feddrick and Liz win "best picture of the week". Elden, Jason, Cynthia and Kelly land in the bottom four. It is announced that Jason and Cynthia will be leaving home, but since it is the first week, they were given another chance.
 Best Picture of The Week: Feddrick and Liz
 Bottom-four: Elden, Jason, Cynthia, Kelly
 Eliminated: None

Episode 3: Beauty Shot
Original Airdate: July 21, 2009

The models have a make-up challenge in Sasa. Alvin & Alice won the make up challenge, receiving themselves extra 5 frames for the photo shoot. Each group of two models were given themes for their photo shoot.

 Challenge winners: Alvin & Alice
 Best Picture of The Week: Feddrick & Shir
 Bottom-four: Elden, George, Kelly, Jenny
 Eliminated: Elden & Kelly

Episode 4: Avant-Garde
Original Airdate: July 28, 2009

The models had a hair styling challenge. Jason and Shir received Wella hair product.
 Challenge winners: Jason and Shir
 Best Picture of The Week: Sam
 Bottom-three: Alvin, Liz, Jenny
 Eliminated: Jenny

Episode 5: Styling on the road
Original Airdate: August 2, 2009

The contestants had a 10 seconds speech challenge with 988. Jovean won the challenge. The contestants have their photo shoot in Putrajaya with a surreal theme.
 Challenge winner: Jovean
 Best Picture of The Week: Felixia
 Bottom three: Cynthia, Alvin, George
 Eliminated: George

Episode 6: Wedding Shoot
Original Airdate: August 9, 2009

The models were transported to a village to do some charity work including giving away them food and drinks to the poor.

The models were paired up for this week's photo shoot as couples posing for their wedding photos at Palace Beach & Spa. The groups are Feddrick & Stephanie, Jovean & Shir, Alvin & Liz, Jason & Alice, Leconte & Felixia, Sam & Cynthia. During panel, after judging and deliberating, Leconte was announced as the winner of the challenge. Alvin, Liz, Jason and Alice were announced as the bottom four. Alvin and Liz were saved to the next round. However, Jason and Alice was supposed to be eliminated, but they were spared.
 Challenge winner: Leconte
 Best Picture of The Week: None
 Bottom four: Alvin, Liz, Jason, Alice
 Eliminated: None

Episode 7: Superstar
Original Airdate: August 16, 2009

The models paired up male and female have to 'buy' their personal style in The Mines shopping mall. Feddrick and Stephanie won the challenge.

This week's photo shoot the models have to posed as if they're superstar.
 Challenge winner: Feddrick & Stephanie
 Best Picture of The Week: Jovean, Shir, Alvin, Alice
 Bottom-four: Leconte, Cynthia, Jason, Liz
 Eliminated: Jason & Liz

Episode 8: Puppets
Original Airdate: August 23, 2009

The models had a go-see challenge, Alvin and Shir won the challenge.
This week's photo shoot is portraying a puppet being neglected wearing clothes by Alexandrea Yeo of Project Runway Malaysia. During panel, the judges said that all the male models are slowly slipping away, and warned them they better step up their game.
 Challenge winner: Alvin & Shir
 Best Picture of The Week: Stephanie
 Bottom-two: Jovean & Cynthia
 Eliminated: Jovean & Cynthia

Episode 9: P. Ramlee
Original Airdate: August 30, 2009

The models meet 4 Malaysian models- Tengku Azura, Joseph Chow, Carla Soong and Peter Davis and taught them more about the modeling industry. The photo shoot, models need to portray characteristic from the 1950/60s, the male models are to be macho and the female are to be soft-spoken. Later, they were to do a couple shot with a story line as well together with the host Jefferey and Cheryl.

 Challenge winner: None
 Best Picture of The Week: Alvin & Shir
 Bottom-two: Feddrick & Alice
 Eliminated: None

Episode 10: Magazine Cover shoot
Original Airdate: September 6, 2009

The models had a body combat work out at Celebrity Fitness. The models posed with International Supermodel Ana R  for Citta Bella Magazine Cover.
 Challenge winner: None
 Best Picture of The Week: Sam & Stephanie
 Bottom-four: Alice, Felixia, Feddrick, Leconte
 Eliminated: Leconte, Felixia

Episode 11: Funeral
Original Airdate: September 13, 2009

The models posed with reptiles and bull in the Sunway Lagoon Wildlife, Alice and Alvin struggles while posing with a snake. The photo shoot took place in the cemetery.
 Challenge winner: None
 Best Picture of The Week: Alice
 Bottom: None
 Eliminated: None

Episode 12: Recycle
Original Airdate: September 20, 2009

The models have a go-see to 4 different locations- Studio Rom, Citta Bella, Cilla & Associates and Salabianca, Philosophy, Grafitee. The models have their photo shoot at a rubbish dump site with a recycle theme, all their outfits and accessories are recyclable materials. The go-see challenge winners were announced at panel.
 Challenge winner: Feddrick & Shir
 Best Picture of The Week: Sam & Stephanie
 Bottom: None
 Eliminated: Feddrick & Alice
 Top-4: Alvin, Sam, Stephanie, Shir

Episode 13: Grand Finals
Original Airdate: September 27, 2009

The finale showcased the top-4 catwalk wearing various top Malaysian designers' design. their photo shoots with past-winners, an autumn theme photo shoot and an ad for Sony Ericsson. The show closes with Malaysian band- Friendz performing a few of their singles; "Hug", "Gemuruh" and "Gimme 5".

 Winners: Sam & Shir
 Runners-up: Alvin & Stephanie

Summaries

Elimination chart

 Note: Contestant who wins the challenge receives extra five frames for the week's photo shoot.

 Male Contestant
 Female Contestant
 Green background with the word WINNER means the contestant won the competition
 Green background with the word WIN means the contestant won "Best Picture of The Week"
 Orange background with the word LOW means the contestant was part of the bottom
 Red background with the word OUT means the contestant was eliminated from the competition
 Black background with the SPD means the contestant was spared from elimination

Photo-shoot guide
 Episode 2 Photo shoot: Promotional shoot
 Episode 3 Photo shoot: Beauty shot
 Episode 4 Photo shoot: Avant-garde
 Episode 5 Photo shoot: Styling on the road
 Episode 6 Photo shoot: Wedding shoot
 Episode 7 Photo shoot: Superstar
 Episode 8 Photo shoot: Puppets
 Episode 9 Photo shoot: P. Ramlee
 Episode 10 Photo shoot: Magazine cover shoot
 Episode 11 Photo shoot: Funeral
 Episode 12 Photo shoot: Recycle
 Episode 13 Photo shoot: Posing with past-winners; Yugo Tham Fall Collection; Sony Ericsson

Hosts
 Jefferey Cheng
 Cheryl Lee

Judges
 Priscllia Yee: International model
 Addy Lee: Hairstylist
 Christopher Low: Fashion photographer

References

I Wanna Be A Model
2009 Malaysian television seasons